Epiphryne is a genus of moths in the family Geometridae erected by Edward Meyrick in 1883.

Species include:
 Epiphryne charidema
 Epiphryne undosata
 Epiphryne verriculata
 Epiphryne xanthaspis

References

External links

Larentiinae
Geometridae genera